Mulug or Mulugu is a city in Telangana, India.

Mulug or Mulugu may also refer to:
 Mulugu district, of which Mulugu is the district headquarters
 Mulug, Siddipet district, a town in Siddipet district
 Mulug (ST) (Assembly constituency)